ASL Airlines Switzerland AG was a Swiss passenger charter and freight airline. The airline operated package delivery services from its base at EuroAirport Basel-Mulhouse-Freiburg throughout Europe, in addition to transport for the Swiss Armed Forces, humanitarian organizations, and the oil industry. Its head office was in Bottmingen, Basel-Landschaft.

History 
The airline was established and started operations in 1984.

In December 2014 the Farnair Group was acquired by Ireland-based ASL Aviation Group. On 4 June 2015, ASL Aviation Group announced that Farnair Switzerland will be rebranded as ASL Airlines Switzerland.

The airline's head office moved to Bottmingen, Basel-Landschaft, in proximity to EuroAirport Basel-Mulhouse-Freiburg, in August 2015. The airline's head office used to be on the Swiss side of EuroAirport Basel  then in Allschwil, Basel-Landschaft.

ASL Airlines Switzerland ceased all operations on 1 February 2018.

Fleet

As of October 2016, the ASL Airlines Switzerland fleet comprised the following aircraft:

References

External links

Official website
 Article on the 30-year history of the FARNAIR Group 

Defunct airlines of Switzerland
Airlines established in 1984
Airlines disestablished in 2018
Defunct cargo airlines
Swiss companies established in 1984
Swiss companies disestablished in 2018